Megastomia corimbensis is a species of sea snail, a marine gastropod mollusk in the family Pyramidellidae, the pyrams and their allies.

Distribution
This species occurs in the following locations:
 Angola
 Cape Verde
 Europe
 São Tomé and Príncipe

References

External links
 To Encyclopedia of Life
 To GenBank

Pyramidellidae
Gastropods described in 1994
Molluscs of the Atlantic Ocean
Molluscs of Angola
Gastropods of Cape Verde
Invertebrates of São Tomé and Príncipe
Fauna of São Tomé Island
Fauna of Príncipe